Love Is A Fat Woman (Spanish: El Amor es una mujer gorda) is a 1987 Argentine drama film written and directed by Alejandro Agresti.

Synopsis 
José is a young journalist who gets fired over refusing to write an article about an American film crew, overdramatizing the situation, in Argentina. When he goes looking for his old girlfriend, he runs into serious difficulties with the crew again.

Cast 
 Elio Marchi ... José
 Sergio Poves Campos ... Caferata
 Carlos Roffé
 Mario Luciani
 Enrique Morales
 Harry Havilio
 Tito Haas
 Christian Cardozo
 Federico Peralta Ramos
 Theodore McNabney (as Theo McNabey)
 Sergio Lerer
 Ernesto Ciliberti
 Silvina Chaine ... Woman on the Train
 Stella Fabrizzi
 José Glusman
 Norma Graziosi
 Silvana Silveri

Planned sequel 
In a recent trip to Dublin, the director came across two Irish men, Darren O'Neill and Brian Bell. It is said that after a week socialising and drinking with the two, he became inspired to make "Loving Fat Women" a sequel to his original movie. In it, he recaps the exploits of the Irish pair on his visit to Ireland and the many hefty women they encountered on their soirees. Already rated "R" it has captivated audiences in pre-screening for its explicitness and the braun of the two lead characters (Brian and Darren) in their search of the next "big" prize (I.e. Fat woman). Original titles considered for the film were "Fat Loving Criminals" and "Larger Than Life".

External links 
 
 

1987 films
Dutch drama films
1987 drama films
1980s Spanish-language films
Films directed by Alejandro Agresti
Films about journalists
Films set in Argentina
Argentine drama films
1980s Argentine films